The 2010 Campeonato Paulista de Futebol Profissional da Primeira Divisão - Série A1 was the 109th season of São Paulo's top professional football league.

Santos were crowned champions after a 5–5 tie on aggregate score against Santo André in the finals, which were held at Pacaembu. As they had ended with best campaign in the first stage, they took the trophy.

Format
The top four teams in the first stage qualifies to the semi-finals. The bottom four teams relegates to the Série A2. Semi-finals and finals are played in two-legged matches.
The four top ranked teams that did not qualify to the semi-finals and from outside the city of São Paulo or Santos FC, would contest each other in the Campeonato do Interior (Interior Championship).

Teams

First stage

League table

Results

Knockout stage

Bracket

Semi-finals

|}

Finals

|}

 Santos were crowned champions due to the best campaign in the first stage.

Campeonato do Interior

Bracket

Semi-finals

|}

Finals

|}

 Botafogo–SP were crowned champions due to the best campaign in the first stage.

Statistics

Top goalscorers

Source: UOL Esporte

Hat-tricks

1 Fernandinho scored 4 goals.

Awards

Team of the year

Player of the Season
The Player of the Season was awarded to Neymar.

Coach of the Season
The Coach of the Season award went to Dorival Júnior.

Top scorer of the Season
The Top scorer award went to Ricardo Bueno, who scored 16 goals.

Young Player of the Season
The Young Player of the Season was awarded to Bruno César.

Countryside Best Player of the Season
The Countryside Best Player of the Season was awarded to Rodriguinho.

Best Goalkeeper of the Season
The Best Goalkeeper of the Season was awarded to Felipe, who conceded 14 goals in 12 matches.

References

Campeonato Paulista seasons
Paulista